Logan McCree (born Philipp Tanzer on December 31, 1977), also known as Kriegerbeatz or DJ Krieger, is the stage name of a German-born ex-gay-pornographic actor who began working in gay pornography in 2007, exclusively signed to the Raging Stallion Studios, a US production company with a three-year contract. He is widely known for his unique and distinctive tattoos over most of his body, including his penis, buttocks and scalp.
He is also known for being a DJ.

History
McCree came to prominence in 2004 as German Mr. Leather.  He starred in and was the cover model for his 2007 debut film, Ink Storm, which in 2008 won a Grabby Award for Best Fetish Video.

In 2008 McCree starred in and wrote the screenplay for a film entitled The Drifter.  On the set, he met and began a long-distance relationship with American porn actor Vinnie D'Angelo.  In 2009, The Drifter won a Grabby Award for Best Movie.  McCree and D'Angelo each won both a Grabby and a GayVN Award for having the Best Duo Sex Scene. McCree's overall performance in The Drifter earned him a Grabby Award for Best Actor, and also a nomination for Best Actor from GayVN. Further still, his script was nominated as Best Screenplay by both the Grabby and GayVN Awards.

In late 2010, he launched his own website, "loganmccree.tv", with self-published video content.

In 2011, McCree came out as bisexual (he had previously identified as gay). In 2012 he moved to Scotland with his girlfriend. In the same year, he starred in the music video for Xiu Xiu's "Joey Song", from the album Always. Since leaving the pornographic industry in 2016, McCree became an anti-gay, far-right men's rights activist.

In 2021, he said in a video that he was heterosexual. In the video, he referred to homosexuality was a deviation and a "brokenness" produced by the absence of a father, and said that children should be kept away from LGBT people, specially from gay men. That year, McCree announced he would be standing as a candidate for the Scottish Family Party, a socially conservative party with strong anti-gay rhetoric, in the Highlands and Islands region during the 2021 Scottish Parliamentary Elections. The Scottish Family Party secured 1,976 votes, meaning McCree was unsuccessful in his bid to win a seat in Parliament.

Awards
 2004 Mr. Leather, Germany
 2009 GayVN Awards:
 Performer of the Year
 Best Sex Scene - Duo, The Drifter, with Vinnie D'Angelo.
 Best Threesome, To the Last Man, with Ricky Sinz and Scott Tanner
 2009 Grabby Awards:
 Best Actor, The Drifter
 Best Duo Sex Scene, The Drifter, with Vinnie D'Angelo
 Best Three-Way Sex Scene, To the Last Man, with Ricky Sinz and Scott Tanner
 2010 XBIZ Awards:
 Gay Performer of the Year
 2010 GayVN Awards:
 Best Actor, The Visitor

Nominations
In addition to the above awards, McCree was nominated for the following:
 2009 GayVN Awards:
 Best Actor, The Drifter
 Best Screenplay, Logan McCree, The Drifter
 Best Sex Scene Duo, To the Last Man, with Scott Campbell
 Best Threesome, Hotter than Hell Part 2, with Dak Ramsey & Tober Brandt
 2009 Grabby Awards:
 Best Screenplay, Logan McCree, The Drifter
 Best Three-Way Sex Scene, Hotter than Hell Part 2, with Dak Ramsey & Tober Brandt
 2010 GayVN Awards:
 Best Actor, The Visitor
 2012 Grabby Awards:
 Hottest Rimming, Giants, Part 1, with Wilfried Knight

Videography
 
 2007 Ink Storm (Winner, 2008 Grabby, Best Fetish Video)
 2008 The 4th Floor
 2008 The 5th Floor
 2008 The Drifter (Winner, 2009 Grabby, Best Movie)
 2008 To the Last Man – The Gathering Storm
 2008 To the Last Man – Guns Blazing
 2008 Hotter than Hell 2
 2008 BarBack
 2008 Jock Itch
 2009 Porn Stars in Love
 2009 Port of Entry
 2009 Rear Deliveries
 2009 Ink Stain
 2009 First Class
 2010 Logan Vs Dragon
 2010 The Visitor
 2010 The Best of Logan McCree (compilation)
 2011 Giants Part 1
 2011 Giants Part 2
 2011 Toy
 2011 Dominus
 2012 Cum In My Face 2
 2012 This is Too Big !
 2012 Xiu Xiu - "Joey's Song" (music video)
 2015 Dick Moves
 2015 Permission

See also
 Grabby Awards
 List of male performers in gay porn films
 List of LGBT periodicals
 Ex-gay movement

References

Sources
 Grabby awards official site
 GayVN awards official site

External links

 
 
 
 
 Logan McCree at the Gay Erotic Video Index
 Official fan site: http://www.official-loganmccree.com
 Private video site: https://www.loganmccree.tv
 Interview for Gay et après? Berlín, LesGaiCineMad 2008

 

1977 births
Actors in gay pornographic films
Living people
German male pornographic film actors
People from Pforzheim
People from Sutherland
LGBT pornographic film actors
People self-identified as ex-gay
Men's rights activists